The Political Constitution of the State of Costa Rica was promulgated on February 10, 1847 under the interim government of José María Alfaro Zamora who convened a Constituent Assembly for that purpose through elections on August 23, 1846. 

This was the first Constitution that established the figure of the Vice President, as well as two ministers; of Relations, Governance, Justice and Ecclesiastical Businesses and of Finance, Public Education, War and Navy. The municipalities are also restricted to mentioning that there will be one Governor per Department.

In 1848, a series of reforms to the Constitution were carried out, again via the Constituent Assembly, which, among other things, changed the name of the country of State of Costa Rica to the Republic of Costa Rica and granted greater powers to the Executive Branch, especially in matters of public appointments. and administrative decisions, that is, it is getting closer and closer to presidentialism.

References

Constitutions of Costa Rica